The Baipaza Dam is a concrete face rock-fill dam on the Vakhsh River about  southeast of Yovon in Khatlon Province, Tajikistan. A purpose of the dam is hydroelectric power generation and it supports a 600 MW power station. The first three 150 MW Francis turbine-generators were commissioned in 1985, the fourth in 1986. This is accomplished by a  tunnel which runs from the right back of the reservoir and through a mountain to the valley.

References

Dams in Tajikistan
Concrete-face rock-fill dams
Dams completed in 1985
Dams on the Vakhsh River
Energy infrastructure completed in 1986
Hydroelectric power stations in Tajikistan
Khatlon Region
Hydroelectric power stations built in the Soviet Union